Gales Ferry is a village in the town of Ledyard, Connecticut, United States. It is located along the eastern bank of the Thames River. The village developed as a result of having a ferry to Uncasville located at this site, and from which the village was named. Gales Ferry was listed as a census-designated place for the 2010 Census, with a population of 1,162.

Much of the core of the original settlement at the site of the former ferry has been included in two separate historic districts, each with several farmstead buildings from the late colonial and early national periods (late 18th and early 19th century). The two historic districts are irregularly shaped, and are separated by a railroad cut and some non-contributing buildings.

Several farmsteads that are individually listed on the National Register of Historic Places are located close to Gales Ferry.  These are the Nathan Lester House on Vinegar Hill Road, the Perkins-Bill House at 1040 Long Cove Road, and the Capt. Mark Stoddard Farmstead at 24 Vinegar Hill Road.

Village

The village is named for the ferry operated by Roger Gale at the current site of a Yale University crew training camp. Gales Ferry is part of the town of Ledyard, with its own post office (ZIP code 06335) and the Gales Ferry branch of the Ledyard library. The community has several neighborhoods, including The Village, Birdland, Christy Hills, Sherwood Forest, Glenwoods, and Presidential Estates. Gales Ferry also has its own volunteer fire department and a small marina. Much of the economic activity in the town revolves around Naval Submarine Base New London just to the south in Groton.

The community has three schools: Juliet W. Long, which is Grades 3-6, the newer Gales Ferry school, which is K-2, and Ledyard Middle School, grade 7-8. They are located off the Thames River next door to each other. The former Gales Ferry School, located in Gales Ferry village, closed in 2001. In 2012, the town began using it as an incubator for local small businesses.

According to the U.S. Census Bureau, Gales Ferry has a total area of 1.23 mi2 (3.18 km2), of which 0.88 mi2 (2.27 km2) is land and 0.35 mi2 (0.91 km2), or 28.7%, is water.

The Ferry

The ferry which gave its name to the surrounding community of Gales Ferry was first established on the Thames in 1740. John Comstock, Ralph Stoddard Jr. and John Hurlbut were the original three ferry men. It became known as Gale's Ferry when it was owned by Roger Gale from 1759 to 1764.

The ferry landing site at Gales Ferry ( at 2 Riverside Place, is now occupied by a complex of buildings owned by Yale University which serve as a training camp for the Yale Heavyweight Men's Crew for the Harvard–Yale Regatta. The complex consists of the Varsity House, Manager's House and the Boathouse. The oldest structure on the site is the front portion of the varsity house which was originally constructed in the late eighteenth century as a private home and which has since been considerably expanded by multiple additions. The boathouse was designed by James Gamble Rogers, who was also responsible for much of the Gothic Revival architecture at Yale's New Haven campus.

The boathouse adjoining the dock serves as a center of activity when the camp is occupied and provides storage and repair space for the boats. Freshman oarsmen are quartered in the second floor of the boathouse. Upperclassmen, including all of the rowers in the varsity and junior varsity boats, are quartered in the top floor of the varsity house. Women on the team, if there are any serving as coxswains, are housed either in the front wing of the varsity quarters or in the manager's house. The varsity house also contains several common spaces including a game room, a central common room and the dining room as well as bathrooms and the kitchen.

The ferry is of considerable historical interest since Yale's crew is the oldest college athletic team in America. The complex's buildings are filled with memorabilia and artifacts from the team's history. This is a living history, however, because of continuing use and occupation that bring the camp to life every year for the race. As the center of Yale Crew's institutional memory and the annual home of the longest-running rivalry in American college sports, the ferry serves as an important site in the history of sports.

Historic districts
Much of the core of the original settlement at the site of the former ferry has been included in two separate historic districts, each with several farmstead buildings from the late colonial and early national periods (late 18th and early 19th century). The two historic districts are irregularly shaped, and are separated by a railroad cut and some non-contributing buildings.

Gales Ferry Historic District No. 1

Gales Ferry Historic District No. 1 is an irregularly shaped district in the area of the junction of Hurlbutt Road and Riverside Place.  It includes work designed by Stephen Gray and examples of Greek Revival, Italianate, and Federal architecture.  The district was listed on the National Register of Historic Places in 1992.  In 1992, it included 31 contributing buildings over 13 acres.

Significant buildings within the district include:
Guy Stoddard House
Benajah Davis House, 7 Riverside Place, c. 1750, Gambrel
Daniel Copp House, 64 Hurlbutt Road, c. 1796, Federal
Sarah Vincent House, 63 Hurlbutt Road, c. 1850, Victorian vernacular
Thomas Geer House, 2 Riverside place, 1796, federal, since expanded in late 19th century for Yale University Crew quarters
John Allyn Jr. House, 54 Hurlbutt Road, 1795, vernacular Cape
Stephen Gray House, 56 Hurlbutt Road, c. 1842, Greek Revival
William Browning House, 52 Hurlbutt Road, 1827, Cape
Capt. Austin Lester House, 1846, Greek Revival, 5 Riverside Place
Rebecca Bailey House, 8 Riverside Place, 1857, Late Greek Revival
John Bradford House, 57 Hurlbutt Road, c. 1850, 19th-century vernacular
William Bracewell House
Capt. Latham Brown House, 2 Riverside Place, c. 1875, Italianate
Lucy B. Hempstead House, 53 Hurlbutt Road, c. 1910, Victorian vernacular
Samuel Brown Store, 55 Hurlbutt Road, 1899
Yale Boathouse, 2 Riverside Place, c. 1910

Gales Ferry Historic District No. 2

Gales Ferry Historic District No. 2 is another irregularly shaped historic district that runs roughly along Hurlbutt Road, from Allyn Road to Military Highway. The district was listed on the National Register of Historic Places in 2002. It is an irregularly shaped area, with boundaries drawn to include historic Colonial, Federal and other architecture, and to exclude more modern intrusions. The Gales Ferry Cemetery and Bishop Seabury Anglican Church are among the contributing sites.

Notable people 
Casey Neistat, YouTube creator and filmmaker

See also 
 Harvard–Yale Regatta
 National Register of Historic Places listings in New London County, Connecticut

References

External links

Town of Ledyard 
Gales Ferry Volunteer Fire Company

Federal architecture in Connecticut
Italianate architecture in Connecticut
Villages in Connecticut
Yale University
Rowing venues in the United States
History of rowing
Census-designated places in New London County, Connecticut
Ledyard, Connecticut
Villages in New London County, Connecticut
Census-designated places in Connecticut
National Register of Historic Places in New London County, Connecticut
Historic districts in New London County, Connecticut
Historic districts on the National Register of Historic Places in Connecticut
Populated places on the Thames River (Connecticut)